The Vienna Kangaroos were an Australian Football club located in Vienna, Austria, and are Austria's first Australian Football club.

History 
The club was established by Australian expatriates and began as the "Wiener Dingos" in 2003. The Irish pub, Flanagans, was the first sponsor, providing playing jumpers. The club doubled as the Austria National team in international competitions until the foundation of the country's second club in Graz in 2008, named the Styrian Down Under Dogs.

The side competed as the Austria National team at the Central European Championship in Düsseldorf in 2004 against sides from Germany, Belgium, France and Spain, but did not perform well. It also competed in the 2005 European Championships in London.

In 2006, the team was renamed "Vienna Kangaroos" and after a successful recruiting drive, it increased the number of Austrian-born players that now comprise the majority of players in the side.

Coming into contact with teams in Croatia and Czech Republic, the club began competing with these sides in a "Tri-nations" cup. Austria held the first competition with the "Schnitzel Cup" in July 2006 in Vienna. Then the team travelled to Zagreb to take part in the "Croatia Open" in August and the final event, the "Prague Cup", was held in Prague in September 2006 as part of the Central European Championships.

Since 2006, the Vienna Kangaroos are a registered sports club.

2006 
 June 2006 Tri-nation Cup in Vienna,    (Austria - Croatia - Czech Republic)
 July 2006 Tri-nation Cup in Zagreb,    (Austria - Croatia - Czech Republic)
 August 2006 Tri-nation Cup in Prague,  (Austria - Croatia - Czech Republic)
 August 2006 CEAFL Cup in Prague,       (Austria - Croatia - Czech Republic - Finland - France)

2007 
 17.03.2007 friendly game against the Munich Kangaroos in Munich
    04.2007 The Vienna Kanagroos become member of the ASKÖ (~Austrian Sport Association)
 09.06.2007 CEAFL Cup in Vienna (2nd place)
 09.08.2007 friendly game against the Munich Kangaroos in Kössen
 24.08.2007 Tri-nation Cup in Prague (2nd place)
 15.09.2007 EU Cup in Hamburg
 06.10.2007 Tri-nation Cup in Zagreb

2008 
 03.05.2008 CEAFL Cup, Zagreb
 07.06.2008 Tri Nation Cup, Vienna
 30.10.2008 friendly game against the Munich Kangaroos in Kössen
 11.10.2008 EU CUP in Prague (12th place)

2009

2010 
With 2010 the Vienna Kangaroos and the Styrian Down Under Dogs are starting the first official Austrian Australian Football league with regular games. Six game days were scheduled to take place. The Kangaroos won the Season against the Styrian Down Under Dogs.

2011 
The Vienna Kangaroos are not providing a team for 2011.

2013 
 08.09.2013 Vienna Kangaroos vs Down Under Dogs
The Vienna Kangaroos played a friendly against the Down Under Dogs from Graz. After a very close battle through 3 and a half quarters they lost 59:74

See also

References

External links
 Vienna Kangaroos website (English)
 Kangaroos sind keine Weicheier at sport.orf.at (German)
 Worum es geht at sport.orf.at (German)

Australian rules football clubs in Austria
Sports clubs in Vienna
2003 establishments in Austria
Australian rules football clubs established in 2003